Richard Winslow (March 25, 1915 – February 7, 1991) was an American film actor, mostly in supporting roles.

He died of complications of diabetes on February 7, 1991, in North Hollywood, Los Angeles, California at age 75.

Filmography

References

External links
 

1915 births
1991 deaths
20th-century American male actors
American male film actors